The 2003 World Junior Figure Skating Championships were held from February 24 to March 2 at the Palace of Culture and Sports in Ostrava, Czech Republic. Medals were awarded in men's singles, ladies' singles, pair skating, and ice dancing.

Due to the large number of participants, the men's and ladies' qualifying groups were split into groups A and B. The ice dancing qualifying event was split into two groups as well, with both groups doing the same dances in the same order. Group B skated their first and second dances one after the other, then Group A skated their first and second, in the same order. The first compulsory dance was the Westminster Waltz, and the second was the Blues.

Medals table

Results

Men

Ladies

Pairs

Ice dancing

External links
 2003 World Junior Figure Skating Championships

World Junior Figure Skating Championships
World Junior Figure Skating Championships, 2003
F
World Junior 2003